Blackfoot High School is a four-year public secondary school located in Blackfoot, Idaho, the only traditional high school in the Blackfoot School District #55 in south central Bingham County.

History 
Founded in the early 1890s, the current BHS building was built in the 1950s. It was given a new science wing in the mid-1990s and in the early 2000s, a new auditorium and gymnasium. The school, sitting adjacent to Stoddard Elementary, has full athletic grounds and a fine arts wing.

In July 2012, Blackfoot High School announced it would offer Shoshoni language classes.

Athletics
Blackfoot competes in athletics in IHSAA Class 4A, the second-highest classification in the state. It is a member of the High Country Conference (4A) with Rigby and Bonneville. The 2012 football team successfully defended its 4A state title, the Broncos' third in four years.

State titles
Boys
 Football (4): fall (4A) 2007, 2009, 2011, 2012 (official with introduction of A-1 playoffs in fall 1979, A-2 in 1978)
(unofficial poll titles - 0) (poll introduced in 1963, through 1978)
 Cross Country (4): fall (A, now 5A) 1972, 1973, 1974, 1975  (introduced in 1964)
 Soccer (1): fall (4A) 2011 (introduced in 2000)
 Basketball (1): (A, now 5A) 1939 
 Wrestling (4): (A-1, now 5A) 1999, 2000; (4A) 2007, 2008  (introduced in 1958)
 Baseball (1): (4A) 2015  (records not kept by IHSAA)

Notable people 

 Marion Jones Callister, attorney and federal judge
 David Cannon, member of the Idaho House of Representatives
 Josh Hill, NFL player
 Dustin Manwaring, member of the Idaho House of Representatives
 Luke Nelson, ski mountaineer
 Mike Simpson, congressman

References

External links
 
 Blackfoot School District #55

Schools in Bingham County, Idaho
Public high schools in Idaho
Shoshone
1894 establishments in Idaho
Blackfoot, Idaho